Lennox Mathematics, Science & Technology Academy (LMSTA) is a charter high school located in Lennox, California, USA. It specialises in mathematics, science and technology for ninth to twelfth grade pupils. In its 2009 rankings, U.S. News & World Report ranked it 21st out of 21,000 US High Schools.  The school has continued to perform highly in subsequent editions of the rankings, scoring 25th and making the Gold Medal List in the most recent version of the report.

References

External links 
 Lennox Mathematics, Science & Technology Academy

High schools in Los Angeles County, California
Charter high schools in California